Jean Bernier (born July 21, 1954) is a retired professional ice hockey player who played 260 games in the World Hockey Association, for the Quebec Nordiques. He was born in Saint-Hyacinthe, Quebec. As a youth, he played in the 1966 and 1967 Quebec International Pee-Wee Hockey Tournaments with a minor ice hockey team from Saint-Hyacinthe.

Career statistics

References

External links

1954 births
Canadian ice hockey defencemen
Chicago Blackhawks draft picks
Living people
Quebec Nordiques (WHA) draft picks
Quebec Nordiques (WHA) players
Shawinigan Bruins players
Shawinigan Dynamos players
Sportspeople from Saint-Hyacinthe
Tulsa Oilers (1964–1984) players
Ice hockey people from Quebec
Canadian expatriate ice hockey players in the United States